Giard is a surname. Notable people with the surname include:

Alfred Mathieu Giard (1846–1908), French zoologist
Harold W. Giard (living), Democratic member of the Vermont State Senate
Jean Giard (born 1936), French politician
Joe Giard (1898–1956), American major league baseball player
Luc Giard (born 1956), Canadian cartoonist and artist
Vincent Giard (born 1983), Canadian editor